Moorella thermoautotrophica, previously known as Clostridium thermoautotrophicum, is a rod-shaped, endospore-forming bacterium belonging to the phylum Bacillota. It is thermophilic, strictly anaerobic and acetogenic, and was isolated from a hot spring in Yellowstone National Park USA.

References

External links
Type strain of Moorella thermoautotrophica at BacDive -  the Bacterial Diversity Metadatabase

Thermoanaerobacterales
Bacteria described in 1981
Thermophiles
Anaerobes
Acetogens